is a species of flowering plant in the genus Sasa, in the Poaceae family.

Description
Sasa veitchii is a large species of bamboo grass which may reach a height of 1-2m, with leaves about 20cm in length and 4-5cm in width. Young leaves are initially uniform green in color but develop light-colored edges as they mature overwinter.
In its native Japan, it is found as a dense covering on some forest floors. The term kumazasa is not precise and can refer to a variety of bamboo grass species other than S.veitchii, including S. kurilensis, S. senanensis, S. palmata, and others.

Uses

This species is often planted in gardens as ornamental ground cover. The leaves can be used to make herbal tea, and are traditionally ground up and taken as a folk remedy for diabetes and hypertension, although there is no scientific consensus on its efficacy as medicine. In Ishikawa, Nagano, and Niigata prefectures, the leaves are used as wrapping for regional varieties of sushi and rice dumplings. It also has some uses as a textile, for example in the manufacture of absorbent floor mats.

References

External links

Bambusoideae
Endemic flora of Japan
Grasses of Asia
Taxa named by Élie-Abel Carrière